was a  after Hōen and before Kōji. This period spanned the year from July 1141 through April 1142.

Change of Era
 February 9, 1141 : The old era name was created to mark an event or series of events. The previous era ended and the old one commenced in Hōen 6, on the 10th day of the 7th month of 1141.

Events of the Eiji Era
 1141 (Eiji  1, 3rd month): The former Emperor Toba accepted the tonsure and became a Buddhist monk at the age of 27 years.
 January 5, 1142 (Eiji 1, 7th day of the 12th month): In the 18th year of Sutoku-tennōs reign (崇徳天皇18年), the emperor abdicated; and the succession (senso) was received by a younger brother, the 8th son of former Emperor Toba. Shortly thereafter, Emperor Konoe is said to have acceded to the Chrysanthemum Throne (sokui).

Notes

References
 Brown, Delmer M. and Ichirō Ishida, eds. (1979).  Gukanshō: The Future and the Past. Berkeley: University of California Press. ;  OCLC 251325323
 Nussbaum, Louis-Frédéric and Käthe Roth. (2005).  Japan encyclopedia. Cambridge: Harvard University Press. ;  OCLC 58053128
 Titsingh, Isaac. (1834). Nihon Odai Ichiran; ou,  Annales des empereurs du Japon.  Paris: Royal Asiatic Society, Oriental Translation Fund of Great Britain and Ireland. OCLC 5850691
 Varley, H. Paul. (1980). A Chronicle of Gods and Sovereigns: Jinnō Shōtōki of Kitabatake Chikafusa. New York: Columbia University Press. ;  OCLC 6042764

External links 
 National Diet Library, "The Japanese Calendar" -- historical overview plus illustrative images from library's collection

Japanese eras